The Salamanca Arts Centre (SAC), established in 1976, is a major arts hub in Hobart, Tasmania, Australia. It is a combination of theatres, galleries and arts administration located behind the historic facade of Georgian warehouses in Salamanca Place. The buildings are owned by the Government of Tasmania with ten visual and performing arts venues. Venues include: the Peacock Theatre, Long Gallery and Sidespace Gallery. Tenants include Brian Ritchie (previously of the Violent Femmes) and the Tasmanian Theatre Company. 

Salamanca Arts Centre is a member of the Australia Council Mobile states tour initiative 'for contemporary artists and small companies, taking cutting edge arts to audiences around Australia.' Other venues include: Performance Space at CarriageWorks, Perth Institute of Contemporary Arts, Brisbane Powerhouse and Arts House.

SAC is supported by the Tasmanian Government and the Hobart City Council.

References

External links
 Salamanca Arts Centre

Buildings and structures in Hobart
Arts centres in Australia
Tourist attractions in Hobart
1976 establishments in Australia